Yunus Murat Ceylan (born 25 December 1979) is a Turkish professional football manager and former player. He is the assistant coach for the Under-19 squad of Beşiktaş. He played as a rightback for various Turkish clubs.

Professional career
Ceylan began his career with Nişantaşıspor, and moved to Beşiktaş after his debut season. He transferred to Manisaspor in 2002. Ceylan made his professional debut with Manisaspor in a 2-2 Süper Lig tie with Ankaragücü on 7 August 2005.

Managerial career
On 22 September 2020, Ceylan was appointed as the manager for Adanaspor.

References

External links
 
 
 Mackolik Profile

1979 births
Living people
Footballers from Istanbul
Turkish footballers
Turkish football managers
Beşiktaş J.K. footballers
Kayserispor footballers
Manisaspor footballers
Diyarbakırspor footballers
Adanaspor footballers
Çaykur Rizespor footballers
Süper Lig players
TFF First League players
TFF Second League players
Association football fullbacks
Adanaspor managers